TUST may refer to:

 Ta Hwa University of Science and Technology in Taiwan
 Tianjin University of Science and Technology in Tianjin